ISAD(G) (General International Standard Archival Description) defines the elements that should be included in an archival finding aid. It was approved by the International Council on Archives (ICA/CIA) as an international framework standard to register archival documents produced by corporations, persons and families.

Description
ISAD(G) defines a list of elements and rules for the description of archives and describes the kinds of information that must and should be included in such descriptions. It creates a hierarchy of description that determines what information should be included at what level.

Principles 
ISAD(G) follows 4 general principles:

 Description from the general to the specific

Multilevel description starts from a general level of description, which is usually the fonds, and proceeds to more detailed levels, such as the subfonds, the series, the file, the item, etc. This hierarchical structure must be represented and properly defined in the archival description.

 Information relevant to the level of description

Information in each level of description must be related only to the archival unit described in that level.

 Linking of descriptions

Every archival unit must be linked to its parent level within the hierarchy and its level must be made explicit.

 Non-repetition of information

To avoid repetition, general information common to a group must be declared in the highest level possible. Sublevels must, in turn, contain common information applicable to its child levels.

Elements 
ISAD(G) defines 26 data elements of description, 6 of which are mandatory, divided into 7 areas:

1.Identity Statement (All elements in the Identity Statement area are mandatory.)

 Reference Codes: Elements used to unequivocally identify the unit of description: country code, repository code, specific local reference code/control number/other unique identifier.

 Title: Name for the unit of description.

 Date: Dates of record creation during the conduction of affairs or dates of document creation.

 Level of Description: Level of the unit of description within the hierarchy.

 Extent and medium of the unit of description: Physical or logical extent and medium of the unit of description.

2.Context (Of the 4 elements that make up the Context Area, only the first one is mandatory.)

 Name: Creator of the unit of description.

 Administrative / Biographical history: Biographical or Administrative details pertaining to the creators of the unit of description.

 Archival history: Relevant historical information on the unit of description.

 Immediate source of acquisition or transfer: Source of acquisition of the material.

3.Content and Structure

 Scope and content: Summary of scope and content relevant to the level of description.

 Appraisal, destruction and scheduling information: Appraisal, destruction and scheduling actions taken on or planned for the unit of description.

 Accruals: Planned additions to the unit of description.

4.Conditions of Access and Use

 Conditions governing access: Information on legal status that may affect access to the unit of description.

 Conditions governing reproduction: Conditions for the reproduction of the unit of description after creation.

 Language/scripts of material: Languages, scripts and symbol systems used in the unit of description.

 Physical characteristics and technical requirements: Relevant physical conditions, software and hardware requirements for the access and preservation of the unit of description.

 Finding aids: Finding aids applicable to the unit of description.

5.Allied Materials

 Existence and location of originals: Information about the existence or destruction of the original unit of description.

 Existence and location of copies: Information about the existence and availability of copies of the unit of description.

 Related units of description: Information about units of description related by provenance or other associations with the unit of description.

 Publication note: Publications that are about or are based on the use, study, or analysis of the unit of description.

6.Notes

 Note: Information that does not fit in any of the previous areas.

7.Description Control

 Archivist's Note: Information on who prepared the description and how.

 Rules or Conventions: Protocols on which the description is based.

 Date(s) of descriptions: Dates of creation and revision.

The standard provides a framework for a common approach, rather than a rigid format.

History
The advent of the internet and electronic records changed the way curators conceived archives. The ability to interrelate archives around the world constitutes both an advantage and a challenge. Thus, there was a need to standardize archival descriptions to make the best use of the technologies available. Standardization in the Archival world was born to increase the number of points of contact between multiple archives across different institutions. Standardization can be considered a tool that archivists must adopt and adapt for their functioning in the contemporary information age.

After initial activities since 1988 supported by UNESCO, a subgroup of the AdHoc Commission on Descriptive Standards discussed the first draft of these standards beginning in 1990. The first version of ISAD(G) was released and adopted by the ICA in 1994. In 1999, an evaluation of ISAD(G) was conducted in order to determine its effectiveness of describing datasets and to evaluate how it had been being used in data archives. After lengthy research and evaluation, the ICA published a revised version, the second edition, in 2000. Sometimes abbreviated as ISAD(G)2, the revised version remains the current standard today.

Since its publication, ISAD(G) has been adopted by a great number of institutions around the world.

Adoption 
ISAD(G) has been adopted as the standard for archival description by many national and international institutions. For example: 

National Organizations

 In the United States, the implementation of ISAD(G) by the Society of American Archivists is described in Describing Archives: A Content Standard (2006).
 In the United Kingdom, ISAD(G) was adopted by The National Archives Cataloguing Standards in 2000.
 In Canada, ISAD(G) was implemented alongside ISSAR(CPF) in the second edition of Rules for Archival Description (RAD2) by the Canadian Council on Archives in 2005.

Transnational Organizations

 The World Bank Group has adopted ISAD(G) as the standard for description of its archival records. Each record has at least one level (Fonds) and where multiple levels are available, they are presented in a tree format. The World Bank Group Archive is arranged into Fonds (level of description) using EAD XML schemas with metadata for the description or archival content following the ISAD(G) standard.
 UNESCO Archives are organized using the AtoM database and adhere to ISAD (G) standard for archival description. The UNESCO Archives are also organized using a method known as archival description in the archives database AtoM for archival description. The archival description standard used by UNESCO Archives in AtoM is the General International Standard for Archival Description (ISAD (G)).

Compatibility with other archival protocols 

ISAD(G) has been implemented by many institutions together with other protocols such as ISO 15489 record management protocol or the ISSAR(CPF) protocol on archival authority records. ISAD(G) has been mapped into archival finding aids protocols such as EDA and structure standards like Dublin Core.

Implementation of ISAD(G) using XML schemas 
EAD: Encoded Archival Description (EAD) uses XML schemas to encode content descriptions mapped to ISAD(G) standards as a guide to determine required data elements and hierarchical relations between said elements. These protocols are not exclusive but complimentary. ISAD(G) is not as specific as EAD with respect to finding aid data, but it offers a useful model for determining both essential elements and the amount of descriptive detail an archivist may wish to gather at each hierarchical level.

Example: Excerpt of an XML schema describing the archival unit Records of the Global Environment Facility  from the World Bank Group Archive using the ISAD(G) protocol: <archdesc level="fonds" relatedencoding="ISAD(G)v2">
<did>
<unittitle encodinganalog="3.1.2">Records of the Global Environment Facility</unittitle>
<unitid encodinganalog="3.1.1">WB IBRD/IDA GEF</unitid>
<unitdate id="atom_503_event" encodinganalog="3.1.3">1988 - 2007</unitdate>
<physdesc encodinganalog="3.1.5"> 265.00 linear feet of textual records (approximate) </physdesc>
<repository>
<corpname>World Bank Group Archives</corpname>
</repository>
<langmaterial encodinganalog="3.4.3">
<language langcode="eng">English</language>
<language langcode="fre">French</language>
</langmaterial>
<origination encodinganalog="3.2.1">
<name id="atom_503_actor">Global Environment Facility</name>
</origination>
</did>
<bioghist id="md5-f21fc51e335ca4fbfd1d0638c5abdd59" encodinganalog="3.2.2">
<note>
<p>
The Global Environment Facility (GEF) began operations in (...)
<lb/>
<lb/>
<lb/>
<lb/>
Initially, the World Bank  (...)
<lb/>
<lb/>
At the conclusion of its pilot phase  (...)
<lb/>
<lb/>
<lb/>
<lb/>
* implementing the decisions of the GEF Assembly and Council;
<lb/>
<lb/>
* coordinating the formulation and overseeing  (...)
<lb/>
<lb/>
<lb/>
<lb/>
<lb/>
<lb/>
Its business activities include:  (...)
<lb/>
<lb/>
As of 2012, the GEF involves  (...)
</p>
</note>
</bioghist>
<odd type="publicationStatus">
<p>Published</p>
</odd>
<scopecontent encodinganalog="3.3.1">
<p>
<lb/>
<lb/>
Records related to GEF's role  (...)
<lb/>
<lb/>
<lb/>
<lb/>
<lb/>
<lb/>
<lb/>
<lb/>
<lb/>
<lb/>
</p>
</scopecontent>
<arrangement encodinganalog="3.3.4">
<p>
The following arrangement is provisional. Records are arranged into eight series:
<lb/>
<lb/>
* Project files
<lb/>
<lb/>
* Monitoring and evaluation records
<lb/>
<lb/>
* Policy development and business strategy records
<lb/>
<lb/>
* Focal Area program records
<lb/>
<lb/>
* Corporateaffairs, liaison, and convention records
<lb/>
<lb/>
* Meetings
<lb/>
<lb/>
* Communications and outreach
<lb/>
<lb/>
* Senior management correspondence
</p>
</arrangement>
<acqinfo encodinganalog="3.2.4">
</acqinfo>
<accruals encodinganalog="3.3.3">
<p>Accruals are expected.</p>
</accruals>
<processinfo>
<p>
<date>22 June 2012</date>
</p>
</processinfo>
<relatedmaterial encodinganalog="3.5.3">
<p>
* See Records of the Environment Sector  (...)
<lb/>
<lb/>
<lb/>
<lb/>
* See Records of the Operations  (...)*
<lb/>
<lb/>
<lb/>
<lb/>
* See Records of Individual Staff Members  (...)*
<lb/>
<lb/>
<lb/>
<lb/>
</p>
</relatedmaterial>
<accessrestrict encodinganalog="3.4.1">
<p>Records are subject to the World Bank Policy on Access to Information.</p>
</accessrestrict>
<userestrict encodinganalog="3.4.2">
<p>Records are subject to the Copyright Policy of the World Bank Group.</p>
</userestrict>
<otherfindaid encodinganalog="3.4.5">
<p>A finding aid for this fonds does not exist.</p>
</otherfindaid>
<dsc type="combined"> </dsc>
</archdesc>

See also
Archival processing
Describing Archives: A Content Standard
Finding aid
International Council on Archives

References

External links 
 

Archival science
International standards
1993 documents
1994 documents
2000 documents